The Story of a Young Heart is the third studio album by A Flock of Seagulls, released in August 1984 by Jive Records. It was their last album—until 2018's Ascension—to feature the original line-up of the band, as guitarist Paul Reynolds left shortly after the album's release. Three singles were released from the album, some only in select countries: "The More You Live, the More You Love", "Never Again (The Dancer)" and "Remember David". The album was reissued in 2008 by Cherry Red Records with bonus tracks.

Reception
Tom Demalon from AllMusic retrospectively praised the "less cluttered, more polished" sound of the album's production, but felt the songs lacked warmth. He took a greater liking to songs such as "Over My Head" and "Heart of Steel", and believed that "Remember David" closely recaptured the band's "hyperkinetic glory" of their first two albums.

People stated that the album, at first listen, seemed "unsatisfyingly bloodless and facile", but believed tracks such as "European (I Wish I Was)", "Over My Head", and "Heart of Steel" "tend[ed] to sound better the more they are played."

Track listing

Personnel

A Flock of Seagulls
 Mike Score – lead vocals, keyboards, guitar
 Frank Maudsley – bass guitar
 Paul Reynolds - lead guitar
 Ali Score – drums

 
Additional personnel
 Steve Lovell – production
 Chris Porter – engineering
 Steve Lipson – engineering (4)
 Phil Vinal – engineering
 Sven Taits, Alister Bullock – assistance
 John Reid – bass (2)
 Pete Watson – art direction
 Eric Watson – photography (back)
 Daniel Thistlethwaite – photography (front)
 Ali Score, Weed – photography (inner sleeve)

Charts

References

1984 albums
A Flock of Seagulls albums
Jive Records albums